Keara Kristen Graves (born 26 April 1999) is a Canadian actor, YouTuber, and singer. They gained prominence through their role on the Family Channel musical series Lost & Found Music Studios.

Early and personal life
Graves was born in Sault Ste. Marie to Kathryn Greco and former NHL player Steve Graves. They have an older sister, Alexandra "Alexa". They are of Italian descent on their mother's side and Irish descent on their father's. The family moved to Whitby when Keara was 4. They attended a Roman Catholic Secondary School before moving to Toronto in 2017.

Graves is queer, genderfluid, and uses they/she pronouns.

They married Lauren Rice on 19 November 2020.

Filmography

Film

Television

Web

References

External links

Living people
1999 births
21st-century Canadian actors
21st-century Canadian singers
Actors from Ontario
Canadian non-binary actors
Canadian people of Irish descent
Canadian people of Italian descent
Canadian web series actors
Canadian YouTubers
Canadian LGBT actors
Canadian LGBT singers
Musicians from Sault Ste. Marie, Ontario
Music YouTubers
Non-binary musicians
Pansexual entertainers
People from Whitby, Ontario
LGBT YouTubers
Pansexual non-binary people
Genderfluid people
21st-century Canadian LGBT people